Nikita Fedorenko (born 6 September 1991) is a Russian trampoline gymnast. In 2012, he represented Russia at the 2012 Summer Olympics in the men's trampoline event. He finished in 6th place in the final.

In 2009, he competed in the men's synchronized trampoline at the World Games held in Kaohsiung, Taiwan.

References

External links 
 

Living people
1991 births
Place of birth missing (living people)
Russian male trampolinists
Medalists at the Trampoline Gymnastics World Championships
Olympic gymnasts of Russia
Gymnasts at the 2012 Summer Olympics
Competitors at the 2009 World Games
21st-century Russian people